Peter Paul Posa  (8 August 1941 – 3 February 2019) was a New Zealand guitarist most famous for his instrumental "The White Rabbit", which was released in 1963. The song is a guitar instrumental that sold 100,000 copies.

Career 
Posa was born in West Auckland, New Zealand, on 8 August 1941 to Paul and Millie Posa, who had migrated from Croatia. Posa started learning the ukelele at the age of seven and formed his first band when he was 18 years old.

In the 2008 Queen's Birthday Honours, Posa was appointed a Member of the New Zealand Order of Merit, for services to entertainment. Posa died at Waikato Hospital on 3 February 2019 at the age of 77.

In 2012, White Rabbit The Very Best of Peter Posa went to the top of the New Zealand album charts, spending six weeks at the number-one spot.

Discography

Studio albums

Live albums

Extended plays

Charting compilation albums

Awards
In the 2008 Queen's Birthday Honours, Posa was appointed a Member of the New Zealand Order of Merit, for services to entertainment.

Aotearoa Music Awards
The Aotearoa Music Awards (previously known as New Zealand Music Awards (NZMA)) are an annual awards night celebrating excellence in New Zealand music and have been presented annually since 1965.

! 
|-
| 2004 || My Pick || Worship of the Year ||  ||rowspan="2"| 
|-
| 2013 || White Rabbit: The Very Best of || Highest Selling Album the Year ||  
|-
| 2020 || Peter Posa || New Zealand Music Hall of Fame ||  || 
|-

References

External links
Peter Posa biography at AudioCulture
Pictures and biography
EMI Catalogue biography

1941 births
2019 deaths
New Zealand musicians
Viking Records artists
Members of the New Zealand Order of Merit
New Zealand people of Croatian descent